Nathaniel Opoku is a Ghanaian professional footballer who plays for  Belgian Pro League side OH Leuven on loan from Leicester City F.C. of the Premier League.

Early life
Opoku started playing football in Ghana with the FDM Field Masters where he was a teammate of Kamal Sowah.

Career

College in United States

Opoku played for Lindsey Wilson College in Columbia, Kentucky, where he scored 19 goals and five assists in 19 games in 2021.

In 2022, Opoku transferred to Syracuse University, where he became a prominent striker in the Atlantic Coast Conference under head coach Ian McIntyre. He helped Syracuse Orange men's soccer team win the National Championship in the 2022 NCAA Division I men's soccer tournament, scoring in the final before they defeated eight-time NCAA Champions Indiana 7-6 on penalties. He totaled 11 goals and eight assists in 25 matches for Syracuse. At the end of the 2022 season, Opoku was named to United Soccer Coaches’ Third-Team All-America and All-ACC First Team as well as he was the NCAA College Cup Most Outstanding Offensive Player, 2022 NCAA All-Tournament Team honoree.

Ventura County Fusion
Opoku played for Ventura County Fusion in USL League Two in 2022. He played and was named as the MVP as Fusion defeated the Long Island Rough Riders to win the USL League Two championship in 2022. Opoku scored 11 goals in 16 appearances in 2022 for Ventura County Fusion.

Leicester City and loan to Belgium
In January 2023, Opoku was reported to have signed for Premier League side Leicester City and loaned to Belgian side OH Leuven for six months. According to Sky Sports News, Opoku rejected the opportunity to be first pick in the 2023 MLS SuperDraft in favour of the European move.

Personal life
Opoku is from Accra, Ghana.

Honours
Syracuse University

 Atlantic Division regular season: 2022
 ACC men's soccer tournament: 2022
 NCAA Division I men's soccer tournament: 2022

 Ventura County Fusion

 USL League Two: 2022
Individual

 USL League Two Championship MVP: 2022
 USL League Two All-League Team: 2022
 USL League Two Western Conference Team: 2022
 NCAA Division I Most Outstanding Offensive Player: 2022
 NCAA All-Tournament Team: 2022
 All-ACC First Team: 2022
 NCAA Third Team All-America: 2022

References

External links
 Syracuse Athletics bio

All-American men's college soccer players
Association football forwards
Expatriate footballers in Belgium
Ghanaian expatriate footballers
Ghanaian expatriate sportspeople in Belgium
Ghanaian footballers
Leicester City F.C. players
Lindsey Wilson Blue Raiders men's soccer players
Living people
Oud-Heverlee Leuven players
Syracuse Orange men's soccer players
Ventura County Fusion players
USL League Two players
Year of birth missing (living people)